Alsophila dealbata, synonym Cyathea dealbata, commonly known as the silver fern or silver tree-fern, or as ponga  or punga  (from Māori  or ), is a species of medium-sized tree fern, endemic to New Zealand. The fern is usually recognisable by the silver-white colour of the under-surface of mature fronds. It is a symbol commonly associated with the country both overseas and by New Zealanders themselves.

Description
This distinctive silver colouration has made them useful for laying along tracks for night walking. The scales are a dark brown and are often twisted and glossy.

Habitat
Arriving relatively late in New Zealand's history during the Pliocene epoch (around 5.0–1.8 million years ago), the silver fern occurs on the main islands of New Zealand—although absent from the west and south regions of the South Island—and on the Chatham Islands to the east. Its primary habitat is subcanopy areas of drier forests and in open scrub, although it is occasionally found on bush margins and in more open areas, and has been recorded from amongst rushes in a dune slack.

The fern is known to grow well in well-drained humus, and once established, it will tolerate drier conditions. It does best when sheltered from winds and should be protected from frost.

In culture

The earliest use of the silver fern as an official emblem was by the New Zealand Army during the Second Boer War. Since then, the silver fern has been used by the New Zealand Expeditionary Force during both world wars, and all Commonwealth war graves of fallen New Zealand soldiers have the silver fern engraved on their tombstones. During the 1956 Suez Crisis, Egyptians took exception to New Zealand and Canadian peacekeepers having the Union Flag on their uniforms. Canadian troops wore the Maple Leaf whereas the New Zealand contingent wore a silver fern symbol. New Zealand peacekeepers have since used both the silver fern and kiwi symbols for different deployments to differentiate from their Australian and British counterparts.

Additionally, several British Army units wear the silver fern, normally as a battle honour granted for serving with New Zealand troops. For example, the Queen’s Royal Hussars, the Royal Wiltshire Yeomanry and the Warwickshire Yeomanry, all of whom fought with 2nd New Zealand Division at the Second Battle of El Alamein.

The silver fern has long been used on dairy products, including the logo of New Zealand Natural, and was trademarked as early as 1885. It is a logo for many other organisations, such as (heavily stylised) the rail operator KiwiRail. The Silver Fern is also the name of a class of railcar.

Silver fern fronds appear on the coat of arms of New Zealand. Some alternative flags for New Zealand, such as the silver fern flag, utilise the fern. The official proposal of the 2015–2016 New Zealand flag referendums featured the silver fern. The silver fern is also used extensively within politics and printed material, such as the logo of the New Zealand Labour Party.

The Silver Fern was first discovered by the Māori people, who are the indigenous people of New Zealand. According to the legend of the Māori people, the Silver Fern “once lived in the sea” and the Māori hunters would “...use the silver underside of the fern leaves to find their way home…”. When bent at an angle, the leaves of the fern would catch the moonlight and “illuminate a path through the forest” 

The koru symbol is inspired by the shape of an unfurling silver fern frond. It is found extensively in Māori art, from carving to the official Māori flag, and is used in a stylised form as the logo for national airline Air New Zealand. Its circular shape conveys the idea of perpetual movement, and its inward coil suggests a return to the point of origin.

In short, the fern has become one of the most widely recognized symbols of New Zealand, next to the kiwi—however, it is not an official national symbol.

Use in sport 
The silver fern has been used as a symbol by New Zealand national sports teams, in various stylised forms, since it was first worn by players in the 1888–89 New Zealand Native football team which toured Britain. "Silver Ferns" is the name of the national netball team, and most other national women's sports teams have nicknames based on the term "Ferns", such as Black Ferns (women's rugby union), Tall Ferns (women's basketball) and Football Ferns (women's association football).

National sport teams using the silver fern include:

All Blacks (rugby)
Silver Ferns (netball)
All Whites (football)
Tall Blacks (basketball)
White Ferns (women's cricket)
Black Caps (men's cricket)
Black Ferns (women's rugby)
Black Sticks Men & Black Sticks Women (field hockey)
Team New Zealand (sailing)
Iron Blacks (American football)

The silver fern is also extensively used as part of the official symbols of New Zealand Olympics teams.

Controversy
In 1991, the New Zealand Rugby Football Union obtained trade marks for the name “All Blacks” and its own stylised fern, however the scope of the application was broader because they sought to register any 'fern'. In 2005, after a legal case lasting four years, the union failed in its bid to stop anyone else using any fern logo on any black jersey.

Footnotes

References

External links
Definitive scientific account of Cyathea dealbata – Te Papa for Flora of New Zealand

dealbata
Ferns of New Zealand
Trees of New Zealand
Endemic flora of New Zealand
National symbols of New Zealand
Ornamental trees
Trees of mild maritime climate
Plants described in 1786